Janet Boyman (died 1572), also known as Jonet Boyman or Janet Bowman, was a Scottish woman accused of witchcraft; she was tried and executed in 1572 although the case against her was started in 1570. Her indictment has been described by modern-day scholars, such as Lizanne Henderson, as the earliest and most comprehensive record of witchcraft and fairy belief in Scotland.

Accusations of witchcraft

Janet Boyman lived in the Cowgate of Edinburgh, and was said to have been from Ayrshire. She was married to William Steill. In early modern Scotland married women did not change their surnames.

She was alleged to have predicted the death of Regent Moray who was assassinated in January 1570, and her accusation was the first to be made in connection with a political conspiracy.

She told her interrogators that she made contact with the supernatural world at a well on the south side of Arthur's Seat a hill close to Edinburgh. There she conjured spirits who would help her heal others. Sometimes she worked cures by washing the patients's shirt at the well at St Leonards.

She was condemned as:ane wyss woman that culd mend diverss seikness and bairnis that are tane away with fairyie men and wemena wise woman that could heal diverse illnesses and children taken away by fairy men and women.

Jonet Boyman was executed on 29 December 1572.

Personal life
There is little information available concerning Boyman's personal life; however the trial record shows her as living in Cowgate, a street in Edinburgh. No indication is given of her age but she was married to William Steill.

References

Notes

Citations

Bibliography

1572 deaths
People executed for witchcraft
Criminals from Edinburgh
16th-century Scottish women
16th-century executions by Scotland
Witch trials in Scotland